Kimber is a name.

People
 Kimber (name)
Includes a list of people with this name
 Kimber may also refer to the Germanic tribe of the Cimbri and related to the German Zimber.

Companies

Project Kimber
Kimber Manufacturing, a firearms company that produces a wide variety of weapons, notably their M1911 pistols: 
Kimber Aegis
Kimber Custom
Kimber Eclipse